The Dark Pictures Anthology: Man of Medan is a 2019 interactive drama and survival horror video game with paranormal horror elements developed by Supermassive Games and published by Bandai Namco Entertainment. It is the first out of eight planned installments in The Dark Pictures Anthology, a series of standalone horror video games. Man of Medan features a cast of five playable protagonists and a multilinear narrative influenced by player choice. The game's decision-making scenes, of which there are several, can significantly alter the trajectory of the plot and change the relationships between the main characters. Due to these choices, any of the five protagonists can die permanently.

Shawn Ashmore stars as the game's leading actor, playing one of the diving squad's members named Conrad. Taking place in the middle of the South Pacific Ocean near French Polynesia, Man of Medan focuses on four college students and the captain of the boat, Duke of Milan, who embark on a diving trip in pursuit of the remains of a WWII-era plane. After a hostile encounter with a group of modern day pirates, the five protagonists are forced by said pirates to sail the seas and search for something called the "Manchurian Gold", subsequently coming across what seems to be a ghost ship where they encounter visions of phantom creatures.

Man of Medan was released for PlayStation 4, Windows, and Xbox One on 30 August 2019, and on PlayStation 5 and Xbox Series X/S on 27 September 2022. A second game in the anthology, Little Hope, was released on 30 October 2020, and its successor House of Ashes was released on 22 October 2021.

Gameplay 

The Dark Pictures Anthology: Man of Medan is a horror themed video game played from a third-person perspective in which single or multiple players assume control of five different characters that become trapped on board a ghost ship. Players are required to make decisions based on their character's "head" or their "heart", or can choose for them to do nothing, while selecting between different options when interacting with other characters. The selection of options are stylised as a compass, which is both representative of the characters' "moral compass" and reflective of the game's nautical themes. The narrative changes and adapts to the choices that the players make, thus making it possible for players to keep all playable characters alive or to have some (or all) of them die. Choices also affect the characters' personality traits (which affects subsequent cutscenes and dialogue options), as well as their relationships with each other. The game can be played multiple times, as there are multiple endings and multiple scenarios based on the decisions that the players make. Action sequences mainly feature quick time events, most of which, if missed, can lead to dire consequences for the characters. As players explore the ghost ship, they can find different "Dark Pictures" that gives them premonitions of what may happen in the future. Players can also uncover the mystery surrounding the tragedy that occurred on the ship in the past, which can help save their character's lives in the present.

Inspired by the popularity of their 2015 game Until Dawns streaming, and the number of people playing the game with their friends by sharing the controls, Supermassive Games introduced two different multiplayer modes in The Dark Pictures Anthology: Man of Medan titled "Shared Story" and "Movie Night". "Shared Story" allows two players to play co-operatively online. "Movie Night" allows up to five players to select their own characters and prompts them to pass the controller at each turn.

Plot 
Man of Medan is presented as an unfinished story in the possession of the omnipresent Curator (Pip Torrens/Tony Pankhurst), who requests the player's assistance in completing it.

A prologue, set after World War II, details an American warship in Manchuria being overrun by ghostly apparitions, causing the death of the crew.

In the present day, brothers Alex (Kareem Alleyne/Tom Weston) and Brad (Chris Sandiford/Tom Weston) are preparing for a diving expedition into the South Pacific Ocean alongside Alex's girlfriend, Julia (Arielle Palik/Zara Sparkes), Julia's brother, Conrad (Shawn Ashmore), and the ship's skipper, Fliss (Ayisha Issa/Storm Stewart). Alex and Julia seek out to find a World War II wreck plane rumoured to have crashed. Meanwhile, a group of fishermen consisting of Danny (Russell Yuen/Jozef Aoki), Junior (Chimwemwe Miller/Michael Addo), and leader Olson (Kwasi Songui/Winston Thomas) crash into Fliss' boat, the Duke of Milan. After the expedition group celebrate, the fishermen ambush the boat and take the protagonists hostage; Brad may optionally remain in hiding. Conrad attempts to steal the fishermen's speedboat, which he can either successfully do so and flee, remain captured, or be killed in the attempt. Olson discovers the coordinates of a seemingly hidden treasure named Manchurian Gold and seeks out to find it with the Duke crew in his captivity.

The Duke crashes into the SS Ourang Medan, the freighter featured in the prologue, which the fishermen board, taking the Duke of Milan's distributor cap to prevent the crew from fleeing. The protagonists immediately plan to regain the distributor cap and escape. The group is split after Fliss is recaptured and Brad is either too captured or leaves the Duke and re-joins her, while the others secretly follow. Both groups begin to witness unknown threats, optionally resulting in deaths: Fliss searches the ship's lower deck, potentially alongside Brad, and locates the Manchurian Gold, a leaking chemical substance; Conrad, if he remained captured, pursues Fliss and is pursued in turn by a female nurse; and Alex and Julia are attacked by Olson and a hallucinogenic version of Alex.

The surviving protagonists regroup and head towards the radio room to request extraction. They contact the military, optionally revealing their co-ordinates and the ship name. The group then again splits, with one team heading further into the generator room and the other remaining with the radio. The team heading to the engine room successfully reactivate the power and surmise that Manchurian Gold was actually a hallucinogenic bioweapon developed during World War II to induce hallucinations on victims.

As Olson pursues, one of the protagonists at the radio decides to investigate after hearing a gunshot. If Alex stayed behind, he goes down with whoever is with him and finds Olson dead before being attacked by rats and optionally destroying the distributor cap and/or dying. If Alex did not stay in the radio room, only one protagonist will investigate. This protagonist is forced into a fight with Olson, with the distributor cap either being recovered or destroyed in the onslaught. If at least one of the generator protagonists survived, they emerge and send a cargo door crashing down on Olson to kill him, with the other protagonist either escaping or being crushed also. Otherwise, Olson kills the radio protagonist before succumbing to a heart attack.

The surviving group members reunite on the outer deck of the ship, with the overall outcome depending on the fate of the group via player choice, whether the Duke of Milan's distributor cap was saved or destroyed, and whether the military was called for assistance alongside whether the ship name was disclosed.

Development 

The Dark Pictures Anthology: Man of Medan was developed by Supermassive Games. After favourable reception of their 2015 title Until Dawn, the team realized that there was a market for interactive drama horror games, and wanted to expand the concept to a larger audience. Thus, The Dark Pictures Anthology series was created, with Man of Medan being the first of eight planned instalments in the series. Supermassive Games stated that they plan on releasing the subsequent seven games every six months in the anthology, with each game based on a horror trope that will feature a unique story with no correlation to the other entries in the series.

Man of Medan was inspired by the urban legend of the SS Ourang Medan, which is about a ghost ship that had allegedly become a shipwreck in Dutch East Indies waters in the late 1940s. Its entire crew was found deceased under mysterious circumstances, with their faces twisted into horrified expressions, which seemed to indicate that they were terrified and had suffered before passing, despite having no visible signs of injury to their bodies and the ship being seemingly unscathed. An effort was made to bring the SS Ourang Medan back to port, but before it could be transported, the ship exploded and sunk underwater. Theories of how the crew died vary, ranging from the rational to the paranormal. The story is most likely fictional, as there is no evidence of the ship having existed at all. The word Ourang is Indonesian or Malay for "man" or "person", while Medan is the largest city on the Indonesian island of Sumatra; giving an approximate translation of "Man from Medan".

Supermassive and publisher Bandai Namco Entertainment officially announced the title on 21 August 2018. The game's cast includes Shawn Ashmore as one of the playable characters and Pip Torrens as the Curator, an omniscient individual who observes the events of the game and communicates directly with the player. It was released for PlayStation 4, Windows, and Xbox One on 30 August 2019. PlayStation 5 and Xbox Series X/S versions were later released on 27 September 2022, alongside a patch for all versions that included new content, quality-of-life features, and accessibility options.

Reception 

The Dark Pictures Anthology: Man of Medan received "generally favorable reviews" for the Windows version, while the PlayStation 4 and Xbox One versions were met with "mixed or average reviews", according to review aggregator Metacritic.

The Dark Pictures Anthology: Man of Medan was the third best-selling game in the United Kingdom in its week of release, behind Astral Chain and Wreckfest. During its first week on sale, 81% of the game's retail copies were sold on PlayStation 4, versus 19% on Xbox One. However, Man of Medan didn't reach the same level of physical sales in comparison to Supermassive's 2015 title Until Dawn, selling 61% fewer physical copies at launch than the PlayStation 4 exclusive.

Awards

Sequels 

The second installment in the Dark Pictures Anthology series, Little Hope, was released for PlayStation 4, Windows, and Xbox One on 30 October 2020. The next installment, House of Ashes, was released for the already-mentioned platforms, as well as PlayStation 5 and Xbox Series X/S, on 22 October 2021. The last installment of Season 1, The Devil in Me, was released for the same platforms as the previous installments, on 18 November 2022.

References

Notes

External links 
 

2019 video games
Bandai Namco games
2010s horror video games
Interactive movie video games
PlayStation 4 games
PlayStation 4 Pro enhanced games
PlayStation 5 games
Multiplayer and single-player video games
Supermassive Games
Unreal Engine games
Video games developed in the United Kingdom
Video games featuring black protagonists
Video games featuring female protagonists
Video games with alternate endings
Windows games
Xbox One games
Xbox One X enhanced games
Xbox Series X and Series S games